Ch'ŏlsong Ch'ŏngnyŏn station is a railway station in Ch'ŏlsong-ri, Musan county, North Hamgyŏng province, North Korea, on the Musan Line of the Korean State Railway. It is also the starting point of the freight-only Musan Mining Branch to Musan Kwangsan station.

There is a locomotive depot located here.

History
Originally called Chinhwa station (Chosŏn'gŭl: 진화역; Hanja: 珍貨駅), it was opened by the Chosen Railway on 15 November 1929, along with the rest of the Sinch'am–Musan section of the Musan Line.

Services
Local passenger trains running between Musan and Ch'ŏngjin on the southern junction of the Hambuk and P'yŏngra lines serve this station, and there are several daily commuter trains for workers between Musan and Ch'ŏlsong and for students between Musan and Komusan. In addition, two daily pairs of local trains, 662/663 and 668/669, operate between Musan and Chuch'o.

References

Railway stations in North Korea
1929 establishments in Korea
Railway stations opened in 1929